Hostages in the Barrio is a 1987 Spanish quinqui film directed by Eloy de la Iglesia, consisting of an adaptation of the stage play La estanquera de Vallecas by José Luis Alonso de Santos. It stars Emma Penella, José Luis Gómez, José Luis Manzano and Maribel Verdú.

Plot 
After two criminals attempt to rob a tobacco retailer in Vallecas, they are trapped inside and eventually develop a sort of friendly relationship with their hostages (the clerk and her niece).

Cast

Production 
An Ega Medios Audiovisuales production, the film was shot in Madrid in 1986. The soundtrack was composed and performed by Patxi Andión. The budget amounted to 83 million ₧.

Release 
The film premiered on 9 April 1987.

Accolades 

|-
| align = "center" | 1988 || 2nd Goya Awards || Best Editing || Julio Peña ||  || align = "center" | 
|}

See also 
 List of Spanish films of 1987

References 

1987 films
Spanish films based on plays
Spanish comedy-drama films
1987 comedy-drama films
Films set in Madrid
Films shot in Madrid
1980s Spanish-language films